Quax may refer to:
Dick Quax (1948–2018), Dutch-born New Zealand athlete and politician
Karl "Quax" Schnörrer (1919–1979), German fighter pilot
Quax the Crash Pilot (1941)
Quax in Africa (1947)